Bring It Back is the third studio album by Illy. The album was released in September 2012  and debuted at number 15 on the ARIA Charts.

Track listing
 "Bring It Back" -  4:25	
 "All the Above"  (featuring Thundamentals)  - 3:50	
 "Where Ya Been"  (featuring Pez) - 3:17
 "Back, Back, Forward" - 3:53
 "The Real"  (featuring Mantra & The Grey Ghost) - 3:25
 "Where Is My Mind, Pt. 2" - 3:28
 "Check It Out" - 3:45
 "Say It to Me" - 3:28
 "The Bridge"  (featuring Reason & Elemont) - 4:33
 "Heard It All" - 3:42
 "Coming Home" - 3:45
 "6 Shooter"  (featuring Purpose, J. Stark, Bitter Belief, Raven & Prime) - 4:27

Charts

References

2012 albums
Illy (rapper) albums
Obese Records albums